Unraced as a Thoroughbred, the stallion Top Deck (1945–1965) went on to become a famous sire of Quarter Horses.

Life

Top Deck was foaled in 1945 and was injured as a young foal, preventing a racing career. His sire was a grandson of Man o' War named Equestrian. His dam was a daughter of Chicaro, a horse known for speed at the short distances.

Breeding record 
He was the sire of Go Man Go, Rebel Cause, Top Ladybug, Mighty Deck, Decketta, War Machine and Moon Deck. Two of his sons were inducted into the American Quarter Horse Hall of Fame – Go Man Go and Moon Deck. He sired 440 Quarter Horse foals, with four AQHA Champions, 219 Race Registers of Merit, twelve Performance Registers of Merit and twenty-one Superior Race Horse awards. Two of his offspring earned the AQHA Supreme Champion award – Astro Deck and War Machine. Top Deck was 20 years old when he died in 1965.

Death and Honors 
Top Deck died in 1965 in Purcell, Oklahoma.

Top Deck was inducted into the American Quarter Horse Hall of Fame in 1990.

Pedigree

Notes

References

 All Breed Pedigree Database Pedigree of Top Deck accessed on June 22, 2007
 American Quarter Horse Foundation – Top Deck accessed on September 2, 2017
 AQHA Hall of Fame accessed on September 2, 2017

External links
 Top Deck at Quarter Horse Directory
 Top Deck at Quarter Horse Legends

American Quarter Horse sires
1945 racehorse births
1965 racehorse deaths
AQHA Hall of Fame (horses)